Alexis De Sart (born 12 November 1996) is a Belgian footballer who plays for Belgian club RWDM, on loan from Antwerp. He plays as a midfielder. He is the brother of Julien De Sart and the son of Jean-François De Sart.

Club career
De Sart is a product of the academy of Standard Liège. On 30 July 2015, he made his professional debut with Standard Liège against FK Željezničar Sarajevo in a UEFA Europa League qualifier.

References

External links

1996 births
Living people
Association football midfielders
Belgian footballers
Belgium under-21 international footballers
Belgium youth international footballers
Standard Liège players
Sint-Truidense V.V. players
Royal Antwerp F.C. players
Oud-Heverlee Leuven players
RWDM47 players
Belgian Pro League players
Challenger Pro League players
People from Waremme
Footballers from Liège Province